A Pittsburgh toilet, or Pittsburgh potty, is a basement toilet configuration commonly found in the area of Pittsburgh, Pennsylvania, United States. It consists of an ordinary flush toilet with no surrounding walls. Most of these toilets are paired with a crude basement shower apparatus and large sink, which often doubles as a laundry basin.

Origin 
The most popular explanation for the Pittsburgh toilet is related to Pittsburgh's status as a major industrial city in the 20th century. According to this explanation, toilets such as these were said to be used by steelworkers and miners who, grimy from the day's labor, could use an exterior door to enter the basement directly from outside and use the basement's shower and toilet before heading upstairs.

Alternatively, they may have served to prevent sewage backups from flooding the living areas of homes. As sewage backups tend to flood the lowest fixture in a residence, a Pittsburgh toilet would be the fixture to overflow, containing the sewage leak in the basement.

References

External links
 Pittsburgh Post-Gazette article mentions Pittsburgh toilet
 Pittsburgh Magazine article on the "Pittsburgh Potty"

Toilets
History of Pittsburgh
Culture of Pittsburgh